E. crocea may refer to:

 Earias crocea, an African moth
 Ectopleura crocea, an athecate hydroid
 Epthianura crocea, a bird endemic to Australia
 Euproctis crocea, an owlet moth
 Exegetia crocea, a moth with a coilable proboscis